SS Edward K. Collins was a Liberty ship built in the United States during World War II. She was named after US Army Lieutenant Colonel Edward K. Collins.

Construction 
Edward K. Collins was laid down on 14 July 1944, under a Maritime Commission (MARCOM) contract, MC hull 2315, by J.A. Jones Construction, Panama City, Florida; sponsored by Mrs. Emily Collins, wife of the namesake; and launched on 17 August 1944.

History
She was allocated to Smith & Johnson, 31 August 1944. On 21 May 1946, she was laid up in the James River Reserve Fleet, Lee Hall, Virginia.

She was sold, on 9 December 1946, for $556,542.74, for commercial use, to Kassos Steam Navigation Company. She was withdrawn from the fleet on 10 January 1947.

References

Bibliography 

 
 
 
 

 

Liberty ships
Ships built in Panama City, Florida
1944 ships
James River Reserve Fleet